Diplozoon paradoxum  is a flatworm (platyhelminth) from the class Monogenea. It is found in freshwater fishes in Asia and Europe and known for its complete monogamy. This parasite is commonly found on the gills of European cyprinid fishes. It is usually around 0.7 centimeters long (approximately the size of a fingernail) and has bilateral symmetry. It  has several hooks at its mouth which it uses to grab on to the gills of a fish. From there it feeds on the blood of the cyprinid.

They exhibit strong seasonal variation in their reproductive activity. Unlike most parasites that produce gametes all year, D. paradoxum gametes are produced primarily during the spring, with the highest production from May to June and continuing through the rest of the summer. The eggs are laid in a freshwater fish's gills. There it hatches into a larval stage (oncomiracidium, diporpa). It remains in that stage unless two larvae come together. Then the two larvae undergo metamorphosis and become fused.

Life cycle 
The life cycle of D. paradoxum is unique. A diporpa larva can live for several months, but it cannot develop further until encountering another diporpa; unless this happens, the diporpa usually dies. When one diporpa finds another, each attaches its sucker to the dorsal papilla of the other.The two worms fuse completely, with no trace of separating partitions. The fusion stimulates maturation. Gonads appear; the male genital duct of one terminates near the female genital duct of the other, permitting cross-fertilization. Two more pairs of clamps develop in the opisthaptor (the attachment organ) of each. Adults can apparently live in this state for several years.

According to The New York Times:

Diplozoon paradoxum [is] a flatworm that lives in gills of freshwater fish. "Males and females meet each other as adolescents, and their bodies literally fuse together, whereupon they remain faithful until death," Dr.  Barash said. "That's the only species I know of in which there seems to be 100 percent monogamy."

References 

 Stewart. "Detailed Taxonomy of the Parasitic Helminths ." Path. Online. 28 January 2008. 
 "Monogeneans and Acanthocephalans." Aber. Online. 28 January 2008. 
 Diplozoon Paradoxum." Parasitology. Online. 28 January 2008. 
 Pioneer Middle School Virtual Zoo http://pioneerunion.ca.schoolwebpages.com/education/components/scrapbook/default.php?sectiondetailid=2788&PHPSESSID=22b198a723c353332b58fb3d7178e0fa
 Roberts, Larry S. & Janovy, John Jr. (2005), Foundations of Parasitology 7th Ed., 305–306

Polyopisthocotylea
Parasitic helminths of fish
Invertebrates of Asia
Invertebrates of Europe
Freshwater animals of Asia
Freshwater animals of Europe
Taxa named by Alexander von Nordmann
Animals described in 1832